Jednota (also known as Jednota Flats) is an unincorporated community in Lower Swatara Township, Dauphin County, Pennsylvania, United States, near the Harrisburg International Airport. The community is part of the Harrisburg–Carlisle Metropolitan Statistical Area.

Overview

It was the site of the Jednota Home and Shrine, a fraternity by the First Catholic Slovak Union (FCSU), operating from 1911 to 1976. A monument marks where the site once stood.

The area is roughly bounded to the north by the mainline Pennsylvania Turnpike Interstate 76, Pennsylvania Route 230 to the south, White House Lane to the west and the Airport Connector to the east. Rosedale Avenue is the principal thoroughfare in the community.

The lower section of Jednota along PA Route 230 is referred to as the Jednota Flats, consisting of a few businesses and mobile home parks. Neighborhoods that make up Jednota Flats include Lisa Lake and Caravan Court.

References

Harrisburg–Carlisle metropolitan statistical area
Unincorporated communities in Dauphin County, Pennsylvania
Unincorporated communities in Pennsylvania